Foolish is the soundtrack to the film of the same name. It was released on March 23, 1999 by No Limit Records and was mainly produced by Beats By the Pound.

The soundtrack proved to be fairly successful, peaking at #32 on the Billboard 200 and #10 on the Top R&B/Hip-Hop Albums. It was certified gold by the RIAA on April 27, 1999 for shipment of over 500,000 copies. The soundtrack was led by two singles: Nothing Stays The Same and Foolish.

Track listing

Charts

Certifications

References

Hip hop soundtracks
Record label compilation albums
Hip hop compilation albums
1999 soundtrack albums
1999 compilation albums
No Limit Records soundtracks
No Limit Records compilation albums
Priority Records soundtracks
Priority Records compilation albums
Gangsta rap soundtracks
Comedy film soundtracks
Drama film soundtracks